The voiceless velar lateral affricate is a relatively uncommon speech sound found as a phoneme in the Caucasus and as an allophone in several languages of eastern and southern Africa. In strict IPA, it needs to be transcribed with diacritics, but a proper letter exists in extIPA: . 

Archi, a Northeast Caucasian language of Dagestan, has two such affricates, plain  and labialized , though they are further forward than velars in most languages, and might better be called prevelar. Archi also has ejective variants of its lateral affricates, several voiceless lateral fricatives, and a voiced lateral fricative at the same place of articulation, but no alveolar lateral fricatives or affricates.

Zulu and Xhosa have a voiceless lateral affricate as an allophone of their voiceless velar affricate. Hadza has an ejective velar lateral affricate as an allophone of its velar ejective affricate. Indeed, in Hadza this  contrasts with a palatal lateral ejective affricate, . ǁXegwi is reported to have contrasted velar  from alveolar .

Laghuu, a Loloish language of Vietnam, contrasts four velar lateral affricates, .

Features
Features of the voiceless velar lateral affricate:

Occurrence

References

Lateral consonants
Pulmonic consonants
Voiceless oral consonants
Velar consonants